Himalayan salt is rock salt (halite) mined from the Punjab region of Pakistan. The salt, which often has a pinkish tint due to trace minerals, is primarily used as a food additive to replace refined table salt but is also used for cooking and food presentation, decorative lamps and spa treatments. The product is often promoted with unsupported claims that it has health benefits.

Geology

Himalayan salt is mined from the Salt Range mountains, the southern edge of a fold-and-thrust belt that underlies the Pothohar Plateau south of the Himalayas in Pakistan. Himalayan salt comes from a thick layer of Ediacaran to early Cambrian evaporites of the Salt Range Formation. This geological formation consists of crystalline halite intercalated with potash salts, overlain by gypsiferous marl and interlayered with beds of gypsum and dolomite with infrequent seams of oil shale that accumulated between 600 and 540 million years ago. These strata and the overlying Cambrian to Eocene sedimentary rocks were thrust southward over younger sedimentary rocks, and eroded to create the Salt Range.

History
Local legend traces the discovery of the Himalayan salt deposits to the army of Alexander the Great. However, the first records of mining are from the Janjua clan in the 1200s. The salt is mostly mined at the Khewra Salt Mine in Khewra, Jhelum District, Punjab, Pakistan, which is situated in the foothills of the Salt Range hill system between the Indus River and the Punjab Plain. It is primarily exported in bulk, and processed in other countries for the consumer market.

Mineral composition
Himalayan salt is a table salt. Analysis of a range of Khewra salt samples showed them to be between 96% and 99% sodium chloride, with trace presence of calcium, iron, zinc, chromium, magnesium, and sulfate, all at varying safe levels below 1%.
Some salts mined in Pakistan are not suitable for food or industrial use without purification due to impurities. Some salt crystals from this region have an off-white to transparent color, while the trace minerals in some veins of salt give it a pink, reddish, or beet-red color.

Nutritionally, Himalayan salt is similar to common table salt. Although a study of pink salts commercially available in Australia showed Himalayan salt to contain higher levels of a range of elements, including calcium, iron, magnesium, manganese, potassium, aluminum, barium, silicon, and sulfur, and reduced levels of sodium, compared to table salt, the authors concluded that "exceedingly high intake" (a level in excess of the recommended daily salt intake by almost 600%) would be required for the differences to be clinically significant, levels at which any potential nutritional benefit would be outweighed by the risks of elevated sodium consumption such an intake would entail. One notable exception regards the essential mineral iodine. Commercial table salt in many countries is supplemented with iodine, and this has significantly reduced disorders of iodine deficiency. Himalayan salt lacks these beneficial effects of iodine supplementation.

Uses

Himalayan salt is used to flavor food. Due mainly to marketing costs, pink Himalayan salt is up to 20 times more expensive than table salt or sea salt. The impurities giving it its distinctive pink hue, as well as its unprocessed state and lack of anti-caking agents, have given rise to the unsupported belief that it is healthier than common table salt. There is no scientific basis for such claimed health benefits. In the United States, the Food and Drug Administration warned a manufacturer of dietary supplements, including one consisting of Himalayan salt, to discontinue marketing the products using unproven claims of health benefits. 

Slabs of salt are used as serving dishes, baking stones, and griddles, and it is also used to make tequila shot glasses. In such uses, small amounts of salt transfer to the food or drink and alter its flavor profile. 

It is also used to make "salt lamps" that radiate a pinkish or orangish hue, manufactured by placing a light source within the hollowed-out interior of a block of Himalayan salt. Claims that their use results in the release of ions that benefit health have no scientific foundation. Similar scientifically unsupported claims underlie use of Himalayan salt to line the walls of spas, along with its use for salt-inhalation spa treatments. Salt lamps can be a danger to pets, who may suffer salt poisoning after licking them.

See also

 Health effects of salt
 List of edible salts
 List of topics characterized as pseudoscience
 Sea salt
 Table salt

References

Edible salt
Pseudoscience
Salt industry in Pakistan